Aigo (stylized as aigo) is the trade name of Chinese consumer electronics company Beijing Huaqi Information Digital Technology Co Ltd. It is headquartered in the Ideal Plaza in Haidian District, Beijing.

History
Beijing Huaqi Information Digital Technology Co Ltd (北京华旗资讯科技发展有限公司) is a consumer electronics manufacturer headquartered in Beijing. It was founded by Féng Jūn, who is the current president, in 1993. The company initially produced keyboards. aigo may be participating in a trend that sees Chinese nationals preferring to purchase locally produced durable goods.

Products
aigo's products include MIDs, digital media players, computer cases, digital cameras, cpu cooling fans, computer peripherals, and monitors.

Subsidiaries
aigo has 27 subsidiaries and several R&D facilities. An incomplete list of aigo's subsidiaries can be found here.

aigo Music
Established in 1993 and located in Beijing, aigo Music operates a digital music service much like iTunes. The first of its kind in China, it is, as of 2009, the biggest portal for legal downloading of music in the country. Strategic partnerships with Warner Music, EMI and Sony allow a wide range of music to be offered at 0.99 yuan per song.

Beijing aifly Education and Technology Co Ltd
aigo set up this English as a Second Language brand with help from Crazy English founder Li Yang.

Beijing aigo Digital Animation Institution
An aigo subsidiary that specializes in 3D animated films.

Huaqi Information Technology (Singapore) Pte Ltd
Set up in October 2003, it operates two official aigo outlet stores in Singapore.

Shenzhen aigo R&D Co Ltd
Established in 2006, this Shenzhen-based research and development facility focuses on the development of mobile multimedia software.

Sponsorships

aigo is a sponsor of a number of sporting events, the majority involving automobile racing.

Motorsport
aigo was an official partner of the Vodafone McLaren Mercedes Formula One team.

As of 2008, aigo sponsors Chinese driver "Frankie" Cheng Congfu, in A1GP racing.

aigo was an  official partner of the 2007 race of champions, a racing competition that uses a variety of different vehicles.

aigo was one of the sponsors of Bryan Herta Autosports during Indianapolis 500.

Football
aigo, as of 2009, has a global strategic cooperation effort with Manchester United.

Notes

References

External links

Aigo
Aigo 
aigo tagged posts @ gizmodo.com
aigo tagged posts @ engadget.com

Electronics companies of China
Chinese brands
Consumer electronics brands
Companies established in 1993
Computer storage companies
Manufacturing companies based in Beijing
Privately held companies of China
1993 establishments in China